Jonny Hey (born 21 September 1949) is a German former professional football player and coach.

Career
Hey played as a midfielder for MSV Duisburg, Arminia Bielefeld, Grasshopper Club Zürich, Fortuna Köln and Wuppertaler SV, who he also managed.

Personal life
His son is Antoine Hey, also a footballer.

References

External links
 

1949 births
Living people
German footballers
Association football midfielders
Bundesliga players
2. Bundesliga players
Wacker 04 Berlin players
Blau-Weiß 1890 Berlin players
MSV Duisburg players
Arminia Bielefeld players
Grasshopper Club Zürich players
SC Fortuna Köln players
Wuppertaler SV players
German football managers
Wuppertaler SV managers
West German expatriate footballers
West German expatriate sportspeople in Switzerland
Expatriate footballers in Switzerland
West German footballers